Jim Hill Mountain is a prominent  mountain summit located in Chelan County of Washington state. Jim Hill Mountain is part of the Chiwaukum Mountains, which are a subset of the Cascade Range. Its nearest higher neighbor is Bulls Tooth,  to the south. Precipitation runoff from the peak drains into tributaries of Nason Creek, which in turn is a tributary of the Wenatchee River. Jim Hill Mountain is set immediately south of the east portal of the Cascade Tunnel, which was built by the Great Northern Railway. This mountain was named by Albert Hale Sylvester to honor James J. Hill (1838–1916), the chief executive officer of the Great Northern Railway. Hill became known during his lifetime as "The Empire Builder", a name bestowed to the Empire Builder passenger train that runs from Seattle to Chicago, and traverses below this mountain.

Climate

Jim Hill Mountain is located in the marine west coast climate zone of western North America. Most weather fronts originate in the Pacific Ocean, and travel northeast toward the Cascade Mountains. As fronts approach, they are forced upward by the peaks of the Cascade Range, causing them to drop their moisture in the form of rain or snowfall onto the Cascades (Orographic lift). As a result, the west side of the Cascades experiences high precipitation, especially during the winter months in the form of snowfall. During winter months, weather is usually cloudy, but, due to high pressure systems over the Pacific Ocean that intensify during summer months, there is often little or no cloud cover during the summer. Because of maritime influence, snow tends to be wet and heavy, resulting in avalanche danger.

Geology

The Alpine Lakes Wilderness features some of the most rugged topography in the Cascade Range with craggy peaks and ridges, deep glacial valleys, and granite walls spotted with over 700 mountain lakes. Geological events occurring many years ago created the diverse topography and drastic elevation changes over the Cascade Range leading to the various climate differences.

During the Pleistocene period dating back over two million years ago, glaciation advancing and retreating repeatedly scoured the landscape leaving deposits of rock debris. The last glacial retreat in the Alpine Lakes area began about 14,000 years ago and was north of the Canada–US border by 10,000 years ago. The "U"-shaped cross section of the river valleys are a result of that recent glaciation. Uplift and faulting in combination with glaciation have been the dominant processes which have created the tall peaks and deep valleys of the Alpine Lakes Wilderness area.

See also

List of peaks of the Alpine Lakes Wilderness
Arrowhead Mountain

References

External links
 Weather forecast: Jim Hill Mountain
Alpine Lakes Wilderness (Okanogan-Wenatchee National Forest) U.S. Forest Service
 YouTube: Skiing the north slope

Mountains of Washington (state)
Mountains of Chelan County, Washington
Cascade Range
North American 2000 m summits